This discography of American rapper Warren G consists of 6 studio albums, 1 EP (extended play), 17 singles, 1 soundtrack album, and 19 music videos.

Albums

Studio albums

Collaborative albums

Extended plays

Singles

As lead artist

As featured artist

Promotional singles

Guest appearances

Music videos
1994: "Regulate"
1994: "This DJ"
1994: "Do You See"
1994: "So Many Ways"
1996: "What's Love Got to Do with It"
1997: "What We Go Through"
1997: "Smokin' Me Out"
1997: "I Shot The Sheriff"
1997: "Prince Igor"
1999: "I Want It All"
1999: "Game Don't Wait"
2001: "Lookin' at You" 
2004: "Groupie Love" (as 213)
2005: "Get U Down Part" 
2005: "I Need A Light" 
2011: "This is Dedicated To You"
2012: "Party We Will Throw Now"
2012: "No One Could Do it Better"
2014: "My House"

Cameo appearances

1992: Dr. Dre - Let Me Ride
1992: Dr. Dre - Dre Day (feat. Snoop Dogg)
1992: Dr. Dre - Nuthin But a G Thang (feat. Snoop Dogg)
1993: Snoop Dogg - What's Ny Name?
1994: Snoop Dogg - Gin and Juice
1995: The Luniz - I Got 5 On It (Remix) (feat. Dru Down, E-40, Richie Rich, Shock G & Spice 1)
1999: Dr. Dre - The Next Episode (feat. Snoop Dogg & Nate Dogg) 
1999: Snoop Dogg - Just Dippin' (feat. Dr. Dre & Jewell)
2002: Ali - Boughetto (feat. Murphy Lee)
2002: Snoop Dogg - From tha Chuuuch to da Palace (feat. Pharrell)
2003: Obie Trice - The Set Up (feat. Nate Dogg)
2005: Snoop Dogg - Ups & Downs\Bang Out (feat. The Bee Gees)
2008: E-40 - Wake It Up (feat. Akon)
2012: Young Jeezy - Leave You Alone (feat. Ne-Yo)
2015: Rap Monster - P.D.D

References
All Music Video Clip Q-Tip at Metix.tv 

Warren G
Discographies of American artists